Yipsi Moreno González (born November 19, 1980, in Camagüey) is a Cuban hammer thrower. She is a triple world champion and Olympic gold medalist, a former world junior record holder and current area record holder.

In 2016, after the 2008 Olympic gold medallist Belarus athlete Aksana Miankova received a disqualification by IAAF, Moreno ostensibly became Olympic hammer throw champion for Cuba in the 2008 Olympic Games in Beijing.

Early life and education 
At the age of 11, she was recruited by the Cerro Pelado Sports School in her hometown, where she started practicing shot put and discus throw. Hammer throw was not a regular women's event at the time, but following its introduction in Cuba in 1993, she eventually concentrated on this event and she earned a place on the national junior team in 1996.

Athletics career

1997–2000 
In 1997, Moreno won the Pan American Junior Championships in Havana with a throw of 55.74 metres, improving the two-year-old championship record with ten metres. She beat the second-place finisher Maureen Griffin by a 46 centimetre margin. This year she threw past the 60 metre mark for the first time, with 61.96 m. The next year, she finished fourth at the 1998 World Junior Championships, this time 29 centimetres behind Griffin. After the World Junior Championships, Moreno started working with a new coach Eladio Hernández, himself a former hammer thrower. The cooperation paid off almost immediately as Moreno established a new world junior record on 29 May 1999 with 66.34 metres at altitude in Mexico City.

Later that year, she won the silver medal at the Pan American Games with 63.03 metres, only beaten by Dawn Ellerbe who threw 65.36. At the World Championships the same year her only valid throw measured 58.68 metres, giving her an eighteenth place in the final (there was no qualification round). At her next major competition, the 2000 Olympics, she improved to fourth place.

2001–2002 
In 2001, she broke the 70 metre barrier for the first time, and improved her personal best to 70.65 metres as she won the World Championships in Edmonton. Three weeks later she won the silver medal at the 2001 Summer Universiade behind Manuela Montebrun of France, who had finished fifth in Edmonton. In 2002, she improved to 71.47 metres in Madrid in July. She was selected to represent the Americas at the 2002 World Cup held in the same city two months later, and finished second.

2003–2005 
In July 2003, she improved further to 75.14 metres. At the Pan American Games she won the gold ahead of compatriot Yunaika Crawford, smashing Dawn Ellerbe's championship record with a 74.25 metres throw. At the World Championships in August she defended her title with a second round effort of 73.33 metres. Her third round result of 72.52 m further secured the gold as runner-up Olga Kuzenkova managed no more than 71.71 m. Commenting on her victory, Moreno stated that she "was happy for Cuba and my family". The inaugural World Athletics Final in Szombathely, where she obtained another triumph, concluded the season. At the end of the year she was named Cuban Sportswoman of the Year for 2003.

2004 was an Olympic year and Moreno was considered the pre-event favourite for the hammer throw contest. Not only was she in lead of the world ranking, her new personal best and South American record of 75.18 metres from the National Cuban Olympics in Havana in April was the world leading result. In the Olympic final, however, her chance of winning soon dwindled as Olga Kuzenkova took the lead and Moreno fouled her first throw. Moreno went on to foul on three of her five remaining efforts, managing 73.36 metres in the fourth round, while Kuzenkova had improved to 75.02 metres in the third round. Yunaika Crawford took the bronze medal behind Moreno.

The 2004 Olympic Games was the only major competition for Moreno in 2004. She did not compete at the World Athletics Final and experienced a foot injury which sidelined her for the first half of 2005. This meant she was dethroned from the leading position at the world ranking, but she recovered the position after a gold medal at the 2005 World Championships and a victory at the 2005 World Athletics Final. For the first time in her career, however, she went a whole season without improving her personal best.

2006–2007 
In early 2006, Moreno won her first Central American and Caribbean Games title, setting another championship record with 70.22 metres. In August she again lost her top ranking position, this time to Russia's Tatyana Lysenko who had established a new world record of 77.80 m. Moreno's season best mark was 74.69 m from the Ostrava Super Grand Prix in May. She finished third at the 2006 World Athletics Final and the 2006 World Cup, both times behind Kamila Skolimowska of Poland.

On 3 March 2007, she broke her own area record as she threw 75.64 metres in Kingston, Jamaica. Establishing the new record in the fifth round of the competition, she followed this up with a 75.43 metres throw in the final round, again longer than her previous personal best. "I have had a good start this year, without physical problems", Moreno explained. On 17 June she improved the record again, with a 76.36 m throw from the second round in the Janusz Kusocinski Memorial, Warsaw.

2008
At the 2008 Olympics Women's Hammer Throw final, Moreno again won a silver medal, this time behind Aksana Miankova of Belarus, who threw an Olympic Record distance of 76.34 meters in her second-to-last round. Moreno was in the silver medal position with one throw left, and in her final effort, she fell short of Miankova with a throw of 75.20 meters, although it was her best throw of the final.

She was declared 2008 Olympic Champion in 2016, after Belarusian Aksana Miankova was disqualified for using prohibited substances.

Personal bests
Hammer throw: 76.62 m –  Zagreb, 9 September 2008

Achievements

Footnotes

References 
 
 IAAF Focus on Athletes
 2008 Olympics Woman's Hammer Throw Results

External links

Ecured biography (in Spanish)

1980 births
Living people
Cuban female hammer throwers
Athletes (track and field) at the 2000 Summer Olympics
Athletes (track and field) at the 2004 Summer Olympics
Athletes (track and field) at the 2008 Summer Olympics
Athletes (track and field) at the 2012 Summer Olympics
Athletes (track and field) at the 1999 Pan American Games
Athletes (track and field) at the 2003 Pan American Games
Athletes (track and field) at the 2007 Pan American Games
Athletes (track and field) at the 2011 Pan American Games
Olympic athletes of Cuba
Olympic silver medalists for Cuba
World Athletics Championships medalists
Medalists at the 2008 Summer Olympics
Medalists at the 2004 Summer Olympics
Pan American Games gold medalists for Cuba
Pan American Games silver medalists for Cuba
Olympic silver medalists in athletics (track and field)
Pan American Games medalists in athletics (track and field)
Universiade medalists in athletics (track and field)
Central American and Caribbean Games gold medalists for Cuba
Competitors at the 2006 Central American and Caribbean Games
Competitors at the 2014 Central American and Caribbean Games
Universiade silver medalists for Cuba
Olympic gold medalists for Cuba
World Athletics Championships winners
Central American and Caribbean Games medalists in athletics
Medalists at the 2001 Summer Universiade
Competitors at the 2001 Goodwill Games
Medalists at the 1999 Pan American Games
Medalists at the 2003 Pan American Games
Medalists at the 2007 Pan American Games
Medalists at the 2011 Pan American Games
People from Camagüey Province